Bernard Robinson may refer to:

Bernard Robinson (production designer) (1912–1970), English set designer
Bernard Robinson (basketball) (born 1980), American National Basketball Association player
Bernard Robinson (footballer) (1911–2004), English professional football player
Bernard Robinson (kickboxer) (born 1966), American kickboxer and Guinness World Record holder